The 22nd Arizona State Legislature, consisting of the Arizona State Senate and the Arizona House of Representatives, was constituted in Phoenix from January 1, 1955, to December 31, 1956, during the first of two terms of Ernest McFarland's time as Governor of Arizona. The number of senators was increased to two per county, for a total of 28, while the members of the house of representatives increased from 80 to 81. The Republicans lost two Senate seats, leaving the Democrats in control of the upper house with a 26–2 margin.  In the House, the Republicans lost ten seats, while the number of seats controlled by the Democrats increased by eleven, giving the Democrats a 61–20 edge.

Sessions
The Legislature met for two regular sessions at the State Capitol in Phoenix. The first opened on January 10, 1955, and adjourned on April 3; while the second convened on January 9, 1956, and adjourned on April 14. There were three Special Sessions: the first convened on October 4, 1955, and adjourned sine die on November 28; the Second Special Session convened on November 28, 1955, and adjourned sine die on December 20; and the Third Special Session convened on December 20, 1955, and adjourned sine die on January 7, 1956.

State Senate

Members

The asterisk (*) denotes members of the previous Legislature who continued in office as members of this Legislature.

House of Representatives

Members 
The asterisk (*) denotes members of the previous Legislature who continued in office as members of this Legislature.

The ** denotes Mrs. Weldon Bailey was appointed until Robert Hathaway was of legal age to serve.

The *** denotesA. C. McCoy was elected, but died in office. M. A. Lindner was appointed to serve the term

References

Arizona legislative sessions
1955 in Arizona
1956 in Arizona
1955 U.S. legislative sessions
1956 U.S. legislative sessions